USS Doyle C. Barnes (DE-353) was a  acquired by the U.S. Navy during World War II. The primary purpose of the destroyer escort was to escort and protect ships in convoy, in addition to other tasks as assigned, such as patrol or radar picket.

Namesake
Doyle Clayton Barnes was born on 5 April 1912 in Oeniville, Texas. He enlisted in the Navy on 20 October 1933 and was designated naval aviator on 21 March 1942. Ensign Barnes received the Navy Cross for his heroism during the Battle of Midway on 4 June 1942, when he intercepted a flight of Imperial Japanese Navy aircraft and downed two torpedo planes. He was reported missing in action 24 August 1942, when his squadron, based on  engaged the Japanese in the Battle of the Eastern Solomons.

Construction and commissioning
She was launched on 4 March 1944 by Consolidated Steel Corp., Ltd., at Orange, Texas, sponsored by Mrs. D. C. Barnes, widow of Ensign Barnes. Doyle C. Barnes was commissioned on 13 July 1944.

History  
Doyle C. Barnes served as a school ship for officers destined for escort vessel service at Norfolk, Virginia, from 25 September to 21 October 1944, then sailed for New Guinea, arriving at Hollandia 28 November. She escorted convoys from Hollandia to San Pedro Bay, Leyte, patrolled in the Philippines, and took part in the assault and occupation of Borneo from 7 June to 20 July 1945.
 
Following the cessation of hostilities Doyle C. Barnes remained in the Far East, providing services at Okinawa, Manila, Tsingtao, and Shanghai. She sailed from Tsingtao 15 April 1946, arriving at San Pedro, Los Angeles on 11 May.

She was towed by USS ATR-66 to San Diego, California, and placed out of commission in reserve there 15 January 1947. She was struck from the Navy list on 1 December 1972 and was sold for scrap on 12 September 1973.

References

External links 
 

John C. Butler-class destroyer escorts
World War II frigates and destroyer escorts of the United States
Ships built in Orange, Texas
1944 ships